The humpback whale (Megaptera novaeangliae) is a species of baleen whale. It is a rorqual (a member of the family Balaenopteridae) and is the only species in the genus Megaptera. The humpback has a distinctive body shape, with long pectoral fins and tubercles on its head. It is known for breaching and other distinctive surface behaviors, making it popular with whale watchers. Males produce a complex song typically lasting 4 to 33 minutes.

Found in oceans and seas around the world, humpback whales typically migrate up to  each year. They feed in polar waters and migrate to tropical or subtropical waters to breed and give birth. Their diet consists mostly of krill and small fish, and they use bubbles to catch prey. They are promiscuous breeders, with both sexes having multiple partners. Orcas are the main natural predators of humpback whales.

Like other large whales, the humpback was a target for the whaling industry. Humans once hunted the species to the brink of extinction; its population fell to around 5,000 by the 1960s. Numbers have partially recovered to some 135,000 animals worldwide, while entanglement in fishing gear, collisions with ships, and noise pollution continue to affect the species.

Taxonomy 
The humpback was first identified as baleine de la Nouvelle Angleterre by Mathurin Jacques Brisson in his Regnum Animale of 1756. In 1781, Georg Heinrich Borowski described the species, converting Brisson's name to its Latin equivalent, Balaena novaeangliae. In 1804, Bernard Germain de Lacépède shifted the humpback from the family Balaenidae, renaming it B. jubartes. In 1846, John Edward Gray created the genus Megaptera, classifying the humpback as Megaptera longipinna, but in 1932, Remington Kellogg reverted the species names to use Borowski's novaeangliae. The common name is derived from the curving of their backs when diving. The generic name Megaptera from the Ancient Greek mega-  ("giant") and ptera/  ("wing") refer to their large front flippers. The specific name means "New Englander" and was probably given by Brisson due to regular sightings of humpbacks off the coast of New England.

Humpback whales are rorquals, members of the Balaenopteridae family, which includes the blue, fin, Bryde's, sei and minke whales. A 2018 genomic analysis estimates that rorquals diverged from other baleen whales in the late Miocene, between 10.5 and 7.5 million years ago. The humpback and fin whale were found to be sister taxon. There is reference to a humpback-blue whale hybrid in the South Pacific, attributed to marine biologist Michael Poole.

Modern humpback whale populations originated in the southern hemisphere around 880,000 years ago and colonized the northern hemisphere 200,000–50,000 years ago. A 2014 genetic study suggested that the separate populations in the North Atlantic, North Pacific, and Southern Oceans have had limited gene flow and are distinct enough to be subspecies, with the scientific names of M. n. novaeangliae, M. n. kuzira and M. n. australis respectively. A non-migratory population in the Arabian sea has been isolated for 70,000 years.

Description 

The adult humpback whale is generally , though longer lengths of  have been recorded. Females are usually  longer than males.

The body is bulky with a thin rostrum and proportionally long flippers, each around one-third of its body length. It has a short dorsal fin that varies from nearly non-existent to somewhat long and curved. As a rorqual, the humpback has grooves between the tip of the lower jaw and the navel. They are relatively few in number in this species, ranging from 14–35. The mouth is lined with baleen plates, which number 270-400 for both sides.

Unique among large whales, humpbacks have bumps or tubercles on the head and front edge of the flippers; the tail fluke has a jagged trailing edge. The tubercles develop early in the womb and may have a sensory function as they are rich in nerves.

The dorsal or upper-side of the animal is generally black; the ventral or underside has various levels of black and white coloration. Whales in the southern hemisphere tend to have more white pigmentation. The flippers can vary from all-white to white only on the undersurface. The varying color patterns and scars on the tail flukes distinguish individual animals. The end of the genital slit of the female is marked by a round lobe. This lobe visually distinguishes males and females.

Behavior and ecology 

Humpback whale groups, aside from mothers and calves, typically last for days or weeks at the most. They are normally sighted in small groups though large aggregations form during feeding and among males competing for females. Humpbacks may interact with other cetacean species, such as right whales, fin whales, and bottlenose dolphins. Humpbacks are highly active at the surface, performing aerial behaviors such as breaching and surface slapping with the tail (lobtailing) and flippers. These may be forms of play and communication and/or for removing parasites.

Humpbacks rest at the surface with their bodies laying horizontally. They appear to dive within  and rarely below . Dives typically do not exceed five minutes during the summer but are normally 15–20 minutes during the winter. As it dives, a humpback typically raises its tail fluke, exposing the underside.

Feeding
Humpback whales feed from spring to fall. They are generalist feeders, their main food items being krill and small schooling fish. The most common krill species eaten in the southern hemisphere is the Antarctic krill. Further north, the northern krill and various species of Euphausia and Thysanoessa are consumed. Fish prey include herring, capelin, sand lances and Atlantic mackerel. Like other rorquals, humpbacks are "gulp feeders", swallowing prey in bulk, while right whales and bowhead whales are skimmers. The whale increases its mouth gape by expanding the grooves. Water is pushed out through the baleen. In the southern hemisphere, humpbacks have been recorded foraging in large compact gatherings numbering up to 200 individuals.

Humpbacks hunt their prey with bubble-nets. A group of whales swim in a shrinking circle while blowing air from their blowholes, capturing the prey above them in a cylinder of bubbles. They may dive up to  performing this technique. Bubble-netting comes in two main forms; upward spirals and double loops. Upward spirals involve the whales blowing air from their blowhole continuously as they circle towards the surface, creating a spiral of bubbles. Double loops consist of a deep, long loop of bubbles that herds the prey, followed by slapping the surface and then a smaller loop that prepares the final capture. Combinations of spiraling and looping have been recorded. After the humpbacks create the "nets", the whales swim into them with their mouths gaping and ready to swallow.

Using network-based diffusion analysis, one study argued that whales learned lobtailing from other whales in the group over 27 years in response to a change in primary prey. The tubercles on the flippers stall the angle of attack, which both maximizes lift and minimizes drag (see tubercle effect). This, along with the shape of the flippers, allows the whales to make the abrupt turns necessary during bubble-feeding.

Courtship and reproduction 

Mating and breeding take place during the winter months, which is when females reach estrus and males reach peak testosterone and sperm levels. Humpback whales are promiscuous, with both sexes having multiple partners. Males will frequently trail both lone females and cow–calf pairs. These are known as "escorts", and the male that is closest to the female is known as the "principal escort", who fights off the other suitors known as "challengers". Other males, called "secondary escorts", trail further behind and are not directly involved in the conflict. Agonistic behavior between males consists of tail slashing, ramming, and head-butting.

Gestation in the species lasts 11.5 months, and females reproduce every two years. Humpback whale births have been rarely observed. One birth witnessed off Madagascar occurred within four minutes. Mothers typically give birth in mid-winter, usually to a single calf. Calves suckle for up to a year but can eat adult food in six months. Humpbacks are sexually mature at 5–10 years, depending on the population. Humpback whales possibly live over 50 years.

Vocalizations 

Male humpback whales produce complex songs during the winter breeding season. These vocals range in frequency between 100 Hz to 4 Hz, with harmonics reaching up to 24 kHz or more, and can travel at least . Males may sing for between 4 and 33 minutes, depending on the region. In Hawaii, humpback whales have been recorded vocalizing for as long as 7 hours. Songs are divided into layers; "subunits", "units", "subphrases", "phrases" and "themes". A subunit refers to the discontinuities or inflections of a sound while full units are individual sounds, similar to musical notes. A succession of units creates a subphrase, and a collection of subphrases make up a phrase. Similar-sounding phrases are repeated in a series grouped into themes, and multiple themes create a song.

The function of these songs has been debated, but they may have multiple purposes. There is little evidence to suggest that songs establish dominance among males. However, there have been observations of non-singing males disrupting singers, possibly in aggression. Those who join singers are males who were not previously singing. Females do not appear to approach singers that are alone, but may be drawn to gatherings of singing males, much like a lek mating system. Another possibility is that songs bring in foreign whales to populate the breeding grounds. It has also been suggested that humpback whale songs have echolocating properties and may serve to locate other whales. A 2023 study found that as humpback whales numbers have recovered from whaling, singing has become less common.

Whale songs are similar among males in a specific area. Males may alter their songs over time, and others in contact with them copy these changes. They have been shown in some cases to spread "horizontally" between neighboring populations throughout successive breeding seasons. In the northern hemisphere, songs change more gradually while southern hemisphere songs go through cyclical "revolutions".

Humpback whales are reported to make other vocalizations. "Snorts" are quick low-frequency sounds commonly heard among animals in groups consisting of a mother–calf pair and one or more male escort groups. These likely function in mediate interactions within these groups. "Grumbles" are also low in frequency but last longer and are more often made by groups with one or more adult males. They appear to signal body size and may serve to establish social status. "Thwops" and "wops" are frequency modulated vocals, and may serve as contact calls both within and between groups. High-pitched "cries" and "violins" and modulated "shrieks" are normally heard in groups with two or more males and are associated with competition. Humpback whales produce short, low-frequency "grunts" and short, modulated "barks" when joining new groups.

Predation
Visible scars indicate that orcas prey upon juvenile humpbacks. A 2014 study in Western Australia observed that when available in large numbers, young humpbacks can be attacked and sometimes killed by orcas. Moreover, mothers and (possibly related) adults escort calves to deter such predation. The suggestion is that when humpbacks suffered near-extinction during the whaling era, orcas turned to other prey but are now resuming their former practice. There is also evidence that humpback whales will defend against or mob killer whales who are attacking either humpback calves or juveniles as well as members of other species, including seals. The humpback's protection of other species may be unintentional, a "spillover" of mobbing behavior intended to protect members of its species. The powerful flippers of humpback whales, often infested with large, sharp barnacles, are formidable weapons against orcas. When threatened, they will thresh their flippers and tails keeping the orcas at bay.

The great white shark is another confirmed predator of the humpback whale. In 2020, Marine biologists Dines and Gennari et al., published a documented incident of a group of great white sharks exhibiting pack-like behavior to attack and kill a live adult humpback whale. A second incident regarding great white sharks killing humpback whales was documented off the coast of South Africa. The shark recorded instigating the attack was a female nicknamed "Helen". Working alone, the shark attacked a  emaciated and entangled humpback whale by attacking the whale's tail to cripple and bleed the whale before she managed to drown the whale by biting onto its head and pulling it underwater.

Range

Humpback whales are found worldwide, except for some areas at the equator and High Arctic and some enclosed seas. The furthest north they have been recorded is at 81°N around northern Franz Josef Land. They are usually coastal and tend to congregate in waters within continental shelves. Their winter breeding grounds are located around the equator; their summer feeding areas are found in colder waters, including near the polar ice caps. Humpbacks go on vast migrations between their feeding and breeding areas, often crossing the open ocean. An isolated, non-migratory population feeds and breeds in the northern Indian Ocean, mainly in the Arabian Sea around Oman. This population has also been recorded in the Gulf of Aden, the Persian Gulf, and off the coasts of Pakistan and India.

In the North Atlantic, there are two separate wintering populations, one in the West Indies, from Cuba to northern Venezuela, and the other in the Cape Verde Islands and northwest Africa. During summer, West Indies humpbacks congregate off New England, eastern Canada, and western Greenland, while the Cape Verde population gathers around Iceland and Norway. There is some overlap in the summer ranges of these populations, and West Indies humpbacks have been documented feeding further east. Whale visits into the Gulf of Mexico have been infrequent but have occurred in the gulf historically. They were considered to be uncommon in the Mediterranean Sea, but increased sightings, including re-sightings, indicate that more whales may colonize or recolonize it in the future.

The North Pacific has at least four breeding populations: off Mexico (including Baja California and the Revillagigedos Islands), Central America, the Hawaiian Islands, and both Okinawa and the Philippines. The Mexican population forages from the Aleutian Islands to California, particularly the Bering Sea, northern and western Gulf of Alaska, southern British Columbia to northern Washington State, and Oregon to California. During the summer, Central American humpbacks are found only off Oregon and California. In contrast, Hawaiian humpbacks have a wide feeding range but most travel to southeast Alaska and northern British Columbia. The wintering grounds of the Okinawa/Philippines population are mainly around the Russian Far East. There is some evidence for a fifth population somewhere in the northwestern Pacific. These whales are recorded to feed off the Aleutians with a breeding area somewhere south of the Bonin Islands.

Southern Hemisphere

In the Southern Hemisphere, humpback whales are divided into seven breeding stocks, some of which are further divided into sub-structures. These include the southeastern Pacific (stock G), southwestern Atlantic (stock A), southeastern Atlantic (stock B), southwestern Indian Ocean (stock C), southeastern Indian Ocean (stock D), southwestern Pacific (stock E), and the Oceania stock (stocks E–F). Stock G breeds in tropical and subtropical waters off the west coast of Central and South America and forages along the west coast of the Antarctic Peninsula, the South Orkney Islands and to a lesser extent the Tierra del Fuego of southern Chile. Stock A winters off Brazil and migrates to summer grounds around South Georgia and the South Sandwich Islands. Some stock A individuals have also been recorded off the western Antarctic Peninsula, suggesting an increased blurring of the boundaries between the feeding areas of stocks A and G.

Stock B breeds on the west coast of Africa and is further divided into Bl and B2 subpopulations, the former ranging from the Gulf of Guinea to Angola and the latter ranging from Angola to western South Africa. Stock B whales have been recorded foraging in waters to the southwest of the continent, mainly around Bouvet Island. Comparison of songs between those at Cape Lopez and Abrolhos Archipelago indicate that trans-Atlantic mixings between stock A and stock B whales occur. Stock C whales winter around southeastern Africa and surrounding waters. This stock is further divided into C1, C2, C3, and C4 subpopulations; C1 occurs around Mozambique and eastern South Africa, C2 around the Comoro Islands, C3 off the southern and eastern coast of Madagascar and C4 around the Mascarene Islands. The feeding range of this population is likely between coordinates 5°W and 60°E and under 50°S. There may be overlap in the feeding areas of stocks B and C.

Stock D whales breed off the western coast of Australia, and forage in the southern region of the Kerguelen Plateau. Stock E is divided into E1, E2, and E3 stocks. E1 whales have a breeding range off eastern Australia and Tasmania; their main feeding range is close to Antarctica, mainly within 130°E and 170°W. The Oceania stock is divided into the New Caledonia (E2), Tonga (E3), Cook Islands (F1) and French Polynesia (F2) subpopulations. This stock's feeding grounds mainly range from around the Ross Sea to the Antarctic Peninsula.

Human relations

Whaling 

Humpback whales were hunted as early as the late 16th century. They were often the first species to be harvested in an area due to this coastal distribution. North Pacific kills alone are estimated at 28,000 during the 20th century. In the same period, over 200,000 humpbacks were taken in the Southern Hemisphere. North Atlantic populations dropped to as low as 700 individuals. In 1946, the International Whaling Commission (IWC) was founded to oversee the industry. They imposed hunting regulations and created hunting seasons. To prevent extinction, IWC banned commercial humpback whaling in 1966. By then, the global population had been reduced to around 5,000. The Soviet Union deliberately under-recorded its catches; the Soviets reported catching 2,820 between 1947 and 1972, but the true number was over 48,000.

As of 2004, hunting was restricted to a few animals each year off the Caribbean island of Bequia in Saint Vincent and the Grenadines. The take is not believed to threaten the local population. Japan had planned to kill 50 humpbacks in the 2007/08 season under its JARPA II research program. The announcement sparked global protests. After a visit to Tokyo by the IWC chair asking the Japanese for their co-operation in sorting out the differences between pro- and anti-whaling nations on the commission, the Japanese whaling fleet agreed to take no humpback whales during the two years it would take to reach a formal agreement. In 2010, the IWC authorized Greenland's native population to hunt a few humpback whales for the following three years.

Conservation status 

As of 2018, the IUCN Red List lists the humpback whale as least-concern, with a worldwide population of around 135,000 whales, of which around 84,000 are mature individuals, and an increasing population trend. Prior to 2008, the IUCN listed the species as vulnerable. Regional estimates are around 13,000 in the North Atlantic, 21,000 in the North Pacific, and 80,000 in the southern hemisphere. For the isolated population in the Arabian sea, only around 80 individuals remain, and this population is considered to be endangered. In most areas, humpback whale populations have recovered from historic whaling, particularly in the North Pacific. Such recoveries have led to the downlisting of the species' threatened status in the United States, Canada, and Australia. In Costa Rica, Ballena Marine National Park was established for humpback protection.

Humpbacks still face various other human-made threats, including entanglement by fishing gear, vessel collisions, human-caused noise and traffic disturbance, coastal habitat destruction, and climate change. Like other cetaceans, humpbacks can be injured by excessive noise. In the 19th century, two humpback whales were found dead near repeated oceanic sub-bottom blasting sites, with traumatic injuries and fractures in the ears. Saxitoxin, a paralytic shellfish poisoning from contaminated mackerel, has been implicated in humpback whale deaths. While oil ingestion is a risk for whales, a 2019 study found that oil did not foul baleen and instead was easily rinsed by flowing water.

Whale researchers along the Atlantic Coast report that there have been more stranded whales with signs of vessel strikes and fishing gear entanglement in recent years than ever before. The NOAA recorded 88 stranded humpback whales between January 2016 and February 2019. This is more than double the number of whales stranded between 2013 and 2016. Because of the increase in stranded whales, NOAA declared an unusual mortality event in April 2017. Virginia Beach Aquarium's stranding response coordinator, Alexander Costidis, stated the conclusion that the two causes of these unusual mortality events were vessel interactions and entanglements.

Whale-watching 

Much of the growth of commercial whale watching was built on the humpback whale. The species' highly active surface behaviors and tendency to become accustomed to boats have made them easy to observe, particularly for photographers. In 1975, humpback whale tours were established in New England and Hawaii. This business brings in a revenue of $20 million per year for Hawaii's economy. While Hawaiian tours have tended to be commercial, New England and California whale watching tours have introduced educational components.

Notable individuals

The Tay whale 

In December 1883, a male humpback swam up the Firth of Tay in Scotland, past what was then the whaling port of Dundee. Harpooned during a failed hunt, it was found dead off Stonehaven a week later. Its carcass was exhibited to the public by a local entrepreneur, John Woods, both locally and then as a touring exhibition that traveled to Edinburgh and London. The whale was dissected by Professor John Struthers, who wrote seven papers on its anatomy and an 1889 monograph on the humpback.

Migaloo 

An albino humpback whale that travels up and down the east coast of Australia became famous in local media because of its rare, all-white appearance. Migaloo is the only known Australian all-white specimen, and is a true albino. First sighted in 1991, the whale was named for an indigenous Australian word for "white fella". To prevent sightseers from approaching dangerously close, the Queensland government decreed a 500-m (1600-ft) exclusion zone around him.

Migaloo was last seen in June 2014 along the coast of Cape Byron in Australia. Migaloo has several physical characteristics that can be identified; his dorsal fin is somewhat hooked, and his tail flukes have a unique shape, with edges that are spiked along the lower trailing side. In July 2022, concerns arose after a white whale washed up on the shores of Mallacoota beach, however after genetic testing, and noting that the carcass was of a female whale while Migaloo is male, it was confirmed by experts to not be Migaloo.

Humphrey 

In 1985, Humphrey swam into San Francisco Bay and then up the Sacramento River towards Rio Vista. Five years later, Humphrey returned and became stuck on a mudflat in San Francisco Bay immediately north of Sierra Point below the view of onlookers from the upper floors of the Dakin Building. He was twice rescued by the Marine Mammal Center and other concerned groups in California. He was pulled off the mudflat with a large cargo net and the help of the US Coast Guard. Both times, he was successfully guided back to the Pacific Ocean using a "sound net" in which people in a flotilla of boats made unpleasant noises behind the whale by banging on steel pipes, a Japanese fishing technique known as oikami. At the same time, the attractive sounds of humpback whales preparing to feed were broadcast from a boat headed towards the open ocean.

See also 

 List of cetaceans
 Wilhelmina Bay
 List of animals with humps

References

External links 

 General
 US National Marine Fisheries Service Humpback Whale web page
 ARKive – images and movies of the humpback whale (Megaptera novaeangliae).
 Humpbacks of Hervey Bay, Queensland, Australia
 The Dolphin Institute Whale Resource Guide and scientific publications
 Humpback Whale Gallery (Silverbanks)
  Humpback whale videos
 The Humpback Whales of Hervey Bay
 Epic humpback whale battle filmed

 Humpback whale songs
 The Whalesong Project
 Article from PHYSORG.com on the complex syntax of whalesong phrases
 Voices of the Sea – Sounds of the Humpback Whale 
 Songlines – Songs of the Eastern Australian Humpback whales

 Conservation
 The Oceania Project, Humpback Whale Research, Hervey Bay

 Videos
 Humpback whales' attempt to stop killer whale attack – Planet Earth Live – BBC One
 Humpback whales defend Gray whale against Killer whales (YouTube)
 Humpbacks Block Orcas’ Feeding Frenzy (LiveScience)
 Humpback whales charge group of transient orcas (Save Our Seas Foundation)
 Humpbacks Chase Killer Whales Right Under Our Boat, 8/24/2014
 Humpback Whale Mother Fights Off Males to Protect Calf | BBC Earth
 Whale Protects Diver From Shark | The Dodo

 Other
 Dead calf at the Amazon rainforest

Mammals described in 1781
Articles containing video clips
Baleen whales
Cosmopolitan mammals
ESA threatened species
Taxa named by Georg Heinrich Borowski